Stanisławów Voivodeship was an administrative district of the interwar Poland (1920–1939). It was established in December 1920 with an administrative center in Stanisławów. The voivodeship had an area of 16,900 km2 and comprised twelve counties (powiaty). Following World War II, at the insistence of Joseph Stalin during Tehran Conference of 1943, Poland's borders were redrawn, Polish population forcibly resettled and Stanisławów Voivodeship was incorporated into the Ukrainian Soviet Socialist Republic as Stanislav Oblast (later renamed as Ivano-Frankivsk Oblast).

September 1939 and its aftermath
Following German invasion on Poland, and in accordance with the secret protocol of Molotov–Ribbentrop Pact, Soviet forces invaded eastern Poland on September 17, 1939. As bulk of the Polish Army was concentrated in the west, fighting Germans, the Soviets met with little resistance and their troops quickly moved westwards. Polish authorities originally intended to organize anti-German resistance in Stanisławów Voivodeship (see: Romanian Bridgehead), with Polish Army units planning to stand ground until the spring of 1940 when a French attack on Germany was expected. However, the Soviet invasion of Poland rendered these plans ineffectual. It is estimated that prior to Soviet counter-offensive in the latter part of World War II, over 18,000 Polish civilians in Stanisławów Voivodeship fell victims to OUN-UPA massacres.

Demographics
The Voivodeship's capital was Stanisławów (now Ivano-Frankivsk in Ukraine). In 1921 was inhabited by 1,339,191 people, and its population density was 72.9 persons per km2. Ukrainians and Ruthenians constituted 68% of the population, especially in the countryside. Poles, distributed across the entire Voivodeship, made around 23%, Polish Jews (mainly in towns), around 7%. Also, there were smaller communities of Galician Germans. In 1931 the population grew to 1,480,300 (mainly among Polish settlers) and the density to 88 persons per km2.

Geography
The Stanisławów Voivodeship's area was 16,894 square kilometers. It was located in south-eastern corner of the country, bordering Tarnopol Voivodeship to the northeast, Lwów Voivodeship to the west, Czechoslovakia (Between 1919 and 1938), Hungary (Between 1938 and 1939) and Romania to the south. It was in large part covered by forests of the Carpathian Mountains, with numerous mountain spas (Worochta, Skole, Dolina, Żabie, Sławsko, Woronienka, Jaremcza, Kuty). The landscape was hilly (in the north) and mountainous (in the south), with Hoverla in the Chornohora range as the highest peak (2060 meters above sea level). The other significant mountain range was the Gorgany.

The main river was the Dniester, which also marked border with the Tarnopol Voivodeship. Other rivers were: the Prut, the Stryj and the Cheremosh (the last one was at the same time bordering Poland from Romania).

Administrative divisions
Before the onset of World War II the Stanisławów Voivodeship consisted of 15 powiats (counties) (earlier 12), 29 towns, 904 villages and numerous smaller communities  (futory, kolonie). Those were the same 12 powiats that were part of the Kingdom of Galicia and Lodomeria with the addition of Turka powiat later on. Its capital Stanisławów was the largest city, with population of some 60,000 (as of 1931). Other important municipal centers of the voivodeship were: Kołomyja (pop. 33,800), Stryj (pop. 30,500), Horodenka (pop. 12,200), Kalusz (pop. 12,100), Sniatyn (pop. 10,800) and Bolechow (pop. 10,700).

The Stanisławów Voivodeship consisted of 12 powiats (counties):
 Dolina Powiat (2,397 km2)
 Horodenka Powiat (849 km2)
 Kałusz Powiat (1,137 km2)
 Kołomyja Powiat (1,339 km2), joined with Peczeniżyn Powiat
 Kosów Powiat (1,839 km2)
 Nadwórna Powiat (2,472 km2)
 Rohatyn Powiat (1,147 km2)
 Stanisławów Powiat (1,249 km2), joined with Bohorodczan Powiat
 Stryj Powiat (2,081 km2), joined with Skolski Powiat
 Śniatyń Powiat (567 km2)
 Tłumacz Powiat (934 km2)
 Żydaczów Powiat (883 km2)

Railroads and industry
The Stanisławów Voivodeship was located in the so-called Poland "B" region, which meant that it was underdeveloped, with low level of industry and considerable numbers of inhabitants living in poverty. Agricultural production was low due to poor quality of soil. Since mid-1930s, the area was quickly gaining popularity as a tourist destination, with numbers of visitors to mountain springs rising steadily year by year. Railroad network was well-developed in the north, with such important junctions as Stanisławów, Kołomyja and Stryj. In the south, however, rail connections were lacking.

On January 1, 1938, total length of railroads within Voivodeship's boundaries was 755 kilometers (4.5 km. per 100 km2).

Voivodes
 

The local government of voivodeship and city was located at address Ulica Karpinskiego, 7 (today - vulytsia Halytska, 2).
Edmund Jurystowski: 21 October 1921 – 18 August 1925
Aleksander Des Loges: 18 August 1925 – 25 October 1926
Władysław Korsak: 18 December 1926 – 12 September 1927
Aleksander Morawski: 28 October 1927 – 30 October 1928
Bronisław Nakoniecznikow-Klukowski: 30 October 1928 – 29 August 1930
Zygmunt Jagodziński: 3 September 1930 – 1 February 1936 (acting until 2 February 1931)
Mieczysław Starzyński: 11 February 1936 – 22 June 1936 (acting )
Jan Sawicki: 23 June 1936 – July 1936
Stefan Pasławski: 14 July 1936 – 20 January 1939
Stanisław Jarecki: 20 January 1939 – 2 September 1939

Following Soviet invasion of Poland on 17 September 1939, the voivodeship existed until 27 November 1939. On 6 October 1939 – 27 November 1939 the voivodeship was governed by Soviet provisional chairman of Civilian Administration Mikhail Grulenko who later continued to hold his post as the 1st secretary of the CPU in the region.

See also
 Podolia
 Biały Słoń

References

 Maly rocznik statystyczny 1939, Nakladem Glownego Urzedu Statystycznego, Warszawa 1939 (Concise Statistical Year-Book of Poland, Warsaw 1939).

External links

 kresy.co.uk - More on history
 Genealogy of Halychyna/Eastern Galicia - 1931 Polish census
 Stanislawow - Kresy - Polish site on Stanislawow
 JewishGen Stanislawow ShtetLink - Jewish genealogy
 Jewish History in Galicia and Bukovina: Stanislawow (Ivano-Frankivsk) Region

 http://jgaliciabukovina.net/161515/article/stanislawow-jews-and-during-holocaust

 
Former voivodeships of the Second Polish Republic
History of Ivano-Frankivsk Oblast
Geographic history of Ukraine